The Artemis Tour is a worldwide concert tour by violinist Lindsey Stirling in support of her fourth album Artemis.  

Starting in 2019, the tour continued until 2022 due to the effects of postponements from the COVID-19 pandemic.

Background
The tour originally began in 2019 with Mexico and Europe the first legs of the tour. The first three concerts in Mexico were held at Mexico City, Guadalajara and Monterrey in August. In September, Stirling was in Europe for 25 concerts starting in Germany and ending in the United Kingdom.

For 2020, the Artemis Tour was due to begin in South America in March and then moving on to Australia in May. However, these dates were cancelled. The 2020 North American tour was also postponed. On August 20, 2020 Stirling performed a virtual concert under the title "Artemis Tour The Reprise" in association with Wave.  The event was streamed live across Twitch, YouTube and Facebook live, as a benefit for St Jude's Children's Hospital.  Stirling was turned into a digital avatar for the performance.   The event raised over $55,000 for the hospital.

In May 2021, Stirling announced a rescheduled 35-date North American concert tour series with special guests Kiesza and Mako. The tour began in Kansas City in July and ended in September at Summerfest in Milwaukee.

Rescheduled dates for the Australian tour leg, and also dates for Russia, Belarus and Ukraine. However, these were later cancelled.

Stirling performed a one-off Artemis series concert for the opening of Bell Bank Park in Arizona in February 2022.

Set list
The following set list is representative of the show in San Diego, California, on August 31, 2021. It is not representative of all concerts for the duration of the tour.

 "Artemis"
 "Til the Light Goes Out"
 "Darkside"
 "Shatter Me"
 "Masquerade"
 "Master of Tides"
 "Love Goes On and On"
 "Crystallize"
 "Married Life / Once Upon a Dream / A Dream Is a Wish Your Heart Makes / You’ve Got a Friend in Me"
 "Between Twilight"
 "Sleepwalking"
 "The Arena/Underground"
 "Roundtable Rival/Don't Let This Feeling Fade"
 "First Light"
 "Mirage"

 Encore
 "Guardian/Lose You Now"

Tour dates

Postponed and cancelled dates

Personnel
Band
Lindsey Stirling – violin
 Drew Steen – drums, percussion 
 Kit Nolan – keyboards, guitars and samples
 Ryan Riveros – keyboards, guitars

Guest appearances
Kiesza (North America)
Mako (North America)

References

External links
Official website

2019 concert tours
2021 concert tours
2022 concert tours
Lindsey Stirling concert tours